Terrorist Takedown 2 (also known as Terrorist Takedown 2: US Navy Seals) is a low-budget first-person shooter video game developed and published by City Interactive. The game uses the LithTech engine developed by Monolith Productions.

Reception

The demo of the game, containing the first mission, gained brief but widespread popularity across Europe after being released as shareware.

References

2007 video games
First-person shooters
Video game sequels
Video games about the United States Navy SEALs
Video games developed in Poland
Windows games
Windows-only games
Multiplayer and single-player video games
CI Games games